Marc Behm (12 January 1925 in Trenton, New Jersey – 12 July 2007 in Fort-Mahon-Plage, France) was an American novelist, actor, and screenwriter, who lived as an expatriate in France. Behm wrote the script for The Beatles' Help! (1965) and the film Charade (1963). His best and most well-known literary work is the crime novel Eye of the Beholder (1980) which was adapted twice for the screen, in 1983 and in 1999.

Behm developed a fascination for French culture while serving in the US Army during World War II; later, he appeared as an actor on several French television programmes, before moving there permanently.

Work

Bibliography 
 The Queen of the Night (1977) 
 The Eye of the Beholder (1980) 
 The Ice Maiden  (1983)
 Afraid to Death (1991) 
 Off the Wall (1991) 
 Seek To Know No More (1993) 
 Crabs (1994)

Filmography 
 1961: The Return of Doctor Mabuse - screenplay
 1963: Charade - story
 1965: Help! - story
 1965: The Party's Over - screenplay
 1966: Trunk to Cairo - screenplay
 1967: The Blonde from Peking - screenplay
 1969: The Thirteen Chairs - screenplay
 1971: Someone Behind the Door - screenplay
 1972: The Mad Bomber - screenplay
 1974: Piaf - screenplay
 1982: Hospital Massacre aka X-Ray - screenplay
 1983: Deadly Circuit - book
 1999: Eye of the Beholder - book

References
 Behm's works and achievements

External links
 

1925 births
2007 deaths
American crime fiction writers
American expatriates in France
American male screenwriters
Novelists from New Jersey
Screenwriters from New Jersey
Writers from Trenton, New Jersey
20th-century American male writers
20th-century American screenwriters